Marion H. Van Berg (January 15, 1896 – May 3, 1971) was an American Thoroughbred racehorse trainer. He was inducted into the National Museum of Racing and Hall of Fame in 1970. His son Jack Van Berg also went on to become a racehorse trainer.

He died of a heart attack on May 3, 1971, in Omaha, Nebraska at age 75.

References

1896 births
1971 deaths
American racehorse trainers
People from Aurora, Nebraska